A maritime disaster is an event which usually involves a ship or ships and can involve military action. Because of the nature of maritime travel, there is often a substantial loss of life. This list covers those disasters in which 30 or more lives were lost during World War I.

See also
 List of hospital ships sunk in World War I
 List of maritime disasters
 List of maritime disasters in the 18th century
 List of maritime disasters in the 19th century
 List of maritime disasters in the 20th century
 List of maritime disasters in World War II
 List of maritime disasters in the 21st century 
 Shipwreck
 List of shipwrecks
 List of disasters
 List of accidents and disasters by death toll
 List by death toll of ships sunk by submarines
 List of RORO vessel accidents

References

Lists of shipwrecks
World War I-related lists
Lists of World War I ships